Brothers are male siblings.

Brothers may also refer to:

Film 
 Brothers (1913 film), an American silent film directed by D. W. Griffith
 Brothers (1929 film), a German film directed by Werner Hochbaum 
 Brothers (1930 film), an American film directed by Walter Lang
 Brothers (1935 film), a Chinese film of the 1930s
 Brothers (1977 film), an American drama film directed by Arthur Barron
 Brothers (1982 film), an Australian war drama directed by Terry Bourke
 Brothers (2004 film), a Danish film 
 Brothers (2004 Chinese film), a Chinese film starring Roy Cheung
 Brothers (2007 film), a Hong Kong film starring Andy Lau, Michael Miu, and Eason Chan
 Brothers (2009 film), an American film starring Tobey Maguire and Jake Gyllenhaal, based on the Danish film
 Brothers (2012 film), a Telugu Indian film, a dubbed version of Tamil film  Maattrraan
 Brothers (2015 film), a Hindi film, a remake of the film Warrior
 Brothers (2016 film), a Chinese war action drama film
 Brothers (2017 adventure film), a Dutch film
 Brothers (2017 drama film), a Dutch film
 Brothers (2023 film), a Czech action drama
 Brothers (upcoming film), an American comedy film directed by Max Barbakow

Literature 
 Brothers (Goldman novel), a 1986 novel by William Goldman
 Brothers (Yu novel), a novel by the Chinese author Yu Hua
 "Brothers" (Dickson), a short story by Gordon R. Dickson
 Brothers (manga), a manga written by Eiji Otsuka and illustrated by Shou Tajima

Music

Albums
 Brothers (The Black Keys album)
 Brothers (Take 6 album)
 Brothers (soundtrack), by Taj Mahal, from the 1977 film (see above)
 Santana Brothers or Brothers, an album by Carlos Santana, Jorge Santana, and Carlos Hernandez

Songs
 "Brothers" (Dean Brody song)
 "Brothers" (Kanye West song)
 "Brothers" (Lil Tjay song)
 "Brothers" (Ola song)
 "Brothers", by Brand New, a B-side of the single "Jesus"
 "Brothers", by Deutsch Amerikanische Freundschaft from 1st Step to Heaven
 "Brothers", by Kid Cudi from Indicud
 "Brothers", by Tiga from Sexor
 "Brothers", by Yngwie Malmsteen from The Seventh Sign

Performers
 The Brothers, a Dutch duo made up of brothers Dean Saunders and Ben Saunders

Television 
 Brothers (1984 TV series), a 1980s American sitcom on Showtime
 Brothers TV, a 2004 Canadian sketch comedy show on Access and OUTtv
 Brothers (2009 TV series), an American sitcom on Fox
 "Brothers" (Star Trek:The Next Generation), a television episode
 "Brothers" (Ugly Betty), a television episode
 Brothers, the international title of Ang Probinsyano, a Philippine television series

People 
 Brothers (surname)

Organizations 
 Brother (Christian), a member of a monastic religious order
 Friars, members of one of the mendicant orders
 Brothers, members of a fraternity
 Brothers, male members of the Rainbow Family

Sports
 Brothers Old Boys, an Australian rugby union team
 CTBC Brothers, a Taiwanese professional baseball team
 Past Brothers, an Australian rugby league team

Other uses 
 Brothers (ferry), a 19th-century Manly-to-Sydney ferry in Australia
 Brothers, Oregon, an unincorporated community in the United States
 Brothers Cider, a brand of cider made in England
 Brothers: A Tale of Two Sons, an adventure video game
 Brothers (HBC vessel), see Hudson's Bay Company vessels

See also 
 
 The Brothers (disambiguation)
 Blood Brothers (disambiguation)
 Bros (disambiguation)
 Birth order